PNP may refer to:

Science and technology
 Purine nucleoside phosphorylase, an enzyme
 4-Nitrophenol or p-nitrophenol
 PNP transistor

Theoretical computer science

 P versus NP, a major unsolved problem in theoretical computer science.

Computing
 Plug and play, not requiring configuration
Legacy Plug and Play or Legacy PnP
 Perspective-n-Point in computer vision
 PnP PowerShell (Patterns and Practices PowerShell), an open source and community driven PowerShell Module designed to work with scripting for Microsoft 365 environments such as SharePoint, Teams, Planner and Power Automate

Organizations
 New Progressive Party (Puerto Rico)
 Partido Nashonal di Pueblo, a Curaçaoan political party
 Press Network of Pakistan (PNP), a media house in Islamabad, Pakistan
 National Patriots' Party, a Burkinabé political party
 National Popular Party (Romania)
 Parti national populaire, a 1970s political party in Quebec, Canada
 People's New Party, Japan
 Peoples National Party (disambiguation)
 Peruvian National Police Policía Nacional del Perú)
 Peruvian Nationalist Party
 Philippine National Police
 Princess Naoko Planning, Naoko Takeuchi's studio
 Progressive National Party (disambiguation)
 Princeton Newport Partners, a hedge fund

Other uses
 Party and play (PnP), a combination of sex and drug use also known as chemsex
 Print and play (PnP), a subset of the boardgaming community where designers and publishers share their digital files and players print and craft the games themselves.

See also
 P&P (disambiguation)
 Universal Plug and Play (UPnP), networking protocols